Sonic Blast is a 1996 side-scrolling platform video game known for its use of pre-rendered visuals. To stop Doctor Robotnik from using Chaos Emerald shards to fortify his base, the player controls Sonic the Hedgehog and Knuckles the Echidna through 15 levels. As a Sonic the Hedgehog series platformer, the characters run and jump to reach the end of a level while defeating enemy robots and collecting rings. In separate bonus stages, the player must run forward and collect rings to earn one of the Chaos Emerald shards.

The game was developed by Aspect Co. and published by Sega for the Game Gear. It was the final Sonic the Hedgehog game for the system, and has been rereleased on the Master System (1997), through two Sonic-themed compilations (2003 and 2004), and the Nintendo 3DS's Virtual Console (2012). Despite their similar titles and coinciding releases, Sonic Blast and Sonic 3D Blast have little in common. Retrospective reviewers generally had little praise for Sonic Blast and have deemed it one of the series' worst games. Although some considered its graphics impressive when considering the technological restrictions of the Game Gear, most found its animations and colors mediocre. The level designs and slow gameplay were also criticized.

Gameplay

Sonic Blast is a 2D side-scrolling platform game. Its story begins when Doctor Robotnik shatters a Chaos Emerald into five shards with a laser. One of the shards hits Sonic the Hedgehog, who, with the help of Knuckles the Echidna, sets out to prevent Robotnik from collecting the other shards and fortifying his island base. Sonic and Knuckles serve as the player-characters of the single-player game. Sonic, in addition to his spinning attacks from prior Sonic games, has a special double-jump that gives him a secondary jump in midair. Knuckles retains his abilities from Sonic & Knuckles: like Sonic, he can perform spin attacks, but can also glide through the air and climb up walls when he hits them in midair. The player travels through 15 levels (called "acts"), across five parts called zones. Every third act contains a boss fight against Robotnik and one of his larger robots. Zones range from the traditional Green Hill Zone to underwater ruins, and feature vertical loops, slides, and teleporters.

In the Sonic series tradition, Sonic and Knuckles collect rings as a form of health. Rings serve as protection for the animals, defending them from the attacks of robot enemies. When taking damage, ten rings scatter across the stage and can be recollected before they disappear. The player starts the game with several lives, which are lost if the player is crushed, drowns, falls into a bottomless pit, or is hit with no rings in their possession. Losing all lives results in a game over, after which the player is returned to the title screen and must restart the game. Power-ups hidden in television monitors provide Sonic and Knuckles numerous boons, including more rings, a burst of speed, shields, invincibility, extra lives, and the ability to save progress in a level. Some monitors, however, contain Robotnik's face and do not grant the player anything. Others contain question marks, which grant any of the power-ups. At the end of an act, the player must hit a signpost to complete the level. The signpost will spin until it lands on an image; the image will grant the player a reward.

Similar in fashion to Sonic the Hedgehog 3, giant rings leading to special stages are hidden around levels. The special stages follow the same basic format of those in Sonic the Hedgehog 2: the player-character runs forward and must collect rings to meet a required amount. They must avoid bombs, and sometimes will jump, run on boost panels, or hop on springs to get more rings. Successful completion of special stages will grant the characters extra lives, rings, or one of the Chaos Emerald shards.

Development and release

Sonic Blast was the fifth and final Sonic the Hedgehog platformer released for the Game Gear, and was developed alongside Sonic Labyrinth and Sonic 3D Blast. Like the previous Game Gear titles, Sonic Blast was developed by Aspect Co. and published by Sega. Key staff from Aspect's prior Sonic games did not work on Sonic Blast. A prominent feature of the game is its pre-rendered visuals, which had been popularized by Donkey Kong Country. The graphics were rendered in 3D before being converted into sprites; the final result has been compared to that of Donkey Kong Country and Mortal Kombat. However, the visuals presented some limitations: Sonic and Knuckles have few animation frames, there is no timer, and the player only loses ten rings when hit. Several gameplay elements were reused from Sonic the Hedgehog 3 and Sonic & Knuckles, such as Sonic's double-jump and the playable characters.

Sonic Blast was released worldwide in November 1996, and in Japan as part of the Kid's Gear brand on December 13, 1996, retitled G Sonic. Worldwide, it was the last Sega-published Game Gear game; it was the system's final game outright in Japan. Though they have similar titles and were released around the same time, Sonic Blast and Sonic 3D Blast have little in common. The game is fairly common in North America, but G Sonic is extremely rare, costing almost 350. A port of the game was released for the Master System exclusively in Brazil in December 1997, distributed by Tectoy. The game had to be simplified to run on the Master System because of its lower graphical quality. Like G Sonic, the Master System version of Sonic Blast is rare.

The game has been rereleased in emulated form several times. Sonic Blast, as well as the other 11 Game Gear Sonic games, is an unlockable bonus in the 2003 GameCube game Sonic Adventure DX: Director's Cut. The game is also available in the compilation Sonic Mega Collection Plus for the PlayStation 2 and Xbox. Sonic Blast received a wide release in 2012 on the Nintendo 3DS's Virtual Console service. New features in the 3DS rerelease include the ability to save player progress and choose between the 3DS's normal screen resolution or the Game Gear's original resolution. The release came as part of a campaign by Nintendo to release 8-bit games on the 3DS eShop following a drought of releases on the distribution service.

Reception and legacy

Retrospective reviewers did not remember Sonic Blast fondly. Nintendo World Report (NWR) summarized the game as "a step back" from the other Game Gear Sonic titles, due to what they called "the attempt at aping Donkey Kong Countrys pre-rendered sprites on a handheld".

Most critics disliked the graphics, some claiming they ruined the game. Digitally Downloaded called the visuals more distracting than impressive—hampering the fluidity of the gameplay and preventing the use of integral series elements—while Nintendo Life thought the game aged badly when compared to the other Sonic Game Gear games with its "muddy colours and shaky animation". Some, such as writers from USgamer and NWR, complained the character graphics were too big for the Game Gear's small screen. Jeuxvideo.com found the character animations poor and said they caused gameplay limitations. Although they were mostly critical of the graphics, reviewers did acknowledge the visuals were impressive when considering the limitations of the Game Gear. Pocket Gamer noted that prior to the game's release, "the capabilities of [the Game Gear] had seemingly been fully explored", writing while they offered some compromises, the visuals made Sonic Blast stand out.

The gameplay was also criticized. NWR wrote that the characters' abilities were difficult to use properly since the screen was zoomed so close to them and particularly disliked the water-based levels, calling them nearly unplayable due to sluggish controls. Nintendo Life held considerable grievances against the inconsistent and random level designs, while Jeuxvideo.com lamented the game lacked the speed previous Sonic games offered, and said the playable characters' abilities, as well as losing only ten rings when hit, made an already-easy game easier. They shared Nintendo Life's concerns about the level designs, and argued the boss fights lacked difficulty. Digitally Downloaded said the game lacked polish: "were you to convert Sonic Blast into the engine of one of the other Game Gear games, its shortcomings would still be prevalent." However, Pocket Gamer praised the game's take on the traditional Sonic formula, calling it "a strong choice for anyone who's enjoyed any other 2D [Sonic game]". Digitally Downloaded, although overall critical, praised the game for its elements of exploration.

Sonic Blast has been called one of the worst games in the Sonic series. NWR exclaimed the game "should be avoided at all costs", and Retro Gamer said its title screen was the only redeeming quality. USgamer wrote it was "an unpleasant end to the Game Gear" and attributed its shortcomings to the system's discontinuation. Complex declared it "the worst handheld Sonic game ever" and said "thank God they didn't attempt the '3D' aspect of its 16-bit older brother". Some reviewers noted Sonic Blast was the first game to give Sonic the standard ability to double-jump, which would be used in later games such as Sonic Colors (2010).

Notes

References

External links

Official Nintendo Minisite 

1996 video games
Aspect Co. games
Master System games
Game Gear games
Sega video games
Side-scrolling video games
Single-player video games
Sonic the Hedgehog video games
Virtual Console games
Virtual Console games for Nintendo 3DS
Video games with pre-rendered 3D graphics
Video games developed in Japan